LKL Sūduvis (M52) is a minehunter of the Lithuanian Naval Force. Germany donated Koblenz to the Lithuanian Naval Force in 1999. The ship, renamed Sūduvis, formed the nucleus of the Lithuanian Naval Force's Squadron of Mine-hunters, which was established on 22 June 1999. The squadron was augmented in 2001 with the similar donation of sister ship Marburg, which became .

References 
 
 

Ships built in Bremen (state)
1957 ships
Cold War minesweepers of Germany
Lindau-class minesweepers of the Lithuanian Naval Force
Minehunters of Lithuania